Hin Gong Railway Halt is a railway halt located in Phong Prasat Subdistrict, Bang Saphan District, Prachuap Khiri Khan.

Train services 
 Ordinary 254/255 Lang Suan-Thon Buri-Lang Suan

References 
 
 

Railway stations in Thailand